Benny Haag (born 8 May 1961) is a Swedish actor and former party leader of Spritpartiet (Liquor Party) which ran in the 2010 Swedish general election on 19 September.

Filmography 
 Lycka till
 Xerxes (TV Series)
 Vargens tid
 Längtans blåa blomma
 Jakten på en mördare
 Kenny Starfighter
 Öbergs på Lillöga
 Den utvalde
 Allt flyter

References

External links 

Official website

Swedish male actors
Leaders of political parties in Sweden
1961 births
Living people